Events from the year 1853 in Scotland.

Incumbents

Law officers 
 Lord Advocate – James Moncreiff
 Solicitor General for Scotland – Charles Neaves; then Robert Handyside; then James Craufurd

Judiciary 
 Lord President of the Court of Session and Lord Justice General – Lord Colonsay
 Lord Justice Clerk – Lord Glencorse

Events 
 12 August – Licensing (Scotland) Act (known after its sponsor as the 'Forbes Mackenzie Act') regulates the supply of intoxicating beverages.
 28 September – emigrant ship Annie Jane sinks in heavy seas off Vatersay, with the loss of 350 lives.
 Highland Clearances in Skye and Raasay.
 National Association for the Vindication of Scottish Rights formed.
 Second cholera pandemic again revives in Scotland.
 Time ball installed on Nelson Monument, Edinburgh.
 Corn exchange built in Dalkeith.
 John Hill Burton publishes his History of Scotland from the Revolution to the Extinction of the last Jacobite Insurrection.

Births 
 12 January – James MacLaren, architect in the "Arts and Crafts" style (died 1890)
 4 March – Hector MacDonald, soldier (suicide 1903 in Paris)
 31 March – Isaac Bayley Balfour, botanist (died 1922)
 10 June – Alexander Watson Hutton, "father of football in Argentina" (died 1936 in Buenos Aires)
 17 July – William Gunion Rutherford, classical scholar (died 1907 in England)

Deaths 
 2 January – William Collins, publisher (born 1789)
 30 July – John Struthers, poet (born 1776)
 28 September – Adam Anderson, Lord Anderson, judge (born c.1797)
 21 October – Robert Gordon, minister of religion and scientist (born 1786)

The arts
 Summer – John Everett Millais stays at Brig o' Turk in Glen Finglas with John Ruskin and his wife Effie to begin painting John Ruskin.
 Alexander Smith's 'A Life Drama' is published as Poems.

See also 
 Timeline of Scottish history
 1853 in the United Kingdom

References 

 
Years of the 19th century in Scotland
Scotland
1850s in Scotland